Wyatt Allen (born January 11, 1979, in Baltimore, Maryland) is an American rower. He won a gold medal at the 2004 Summer Olympics and a bronze medal at the 2008 Summer Olympics. He is a graduate of Portland High School and the University of Virginia, where he rowed on the men's club team from 1998 to 2001. He is currently the head coach of men's heavyweight rowing at Dartmouth College.

References

1979 births
Living people
Sportspeople from Portland, Maine
Rowers at the 2004 Summer Olympics
Rowers at the 2008 Summer Olympics
Olympic bronze medalists for the United States in rowing
Olympic gold medalists for the United States in rowing
University of Virginia alumni
American male rowers
Medalists at the 2008 Summer Olympics
Medalists at the 2004 Summer Olympics
Portland High School (Maine) alumni
Virginia Cavaliers rowers